The National Museum of the Republic of Kazakhstan (Qazaqstan Respýblıkasynyń Ulltyq mýzeıi), is located in Astana.  The museum opened on July 2, 2014 in a 74,000 square meter building.

History

The museum has been created in the framework of the "Cultural Heritage" State Program on behalf of the President of the Republic of Kazakhstan Nursultan Nazarbayev. July 2, 2013 the Decree of the Government of the Republic of Kazakhstan № 675 was issued on the establishment of the Republican State Institution "National Museum of the Republic of Kazakhstan" of the Ministry of Culture of the Republic of Kazakhstan. "

According to the Decree of the Head of the State Darkhan Mynbay has been appointed the Director of the National Museum of Kazakhstan.
The museum is located on the main square of the country - the Independence Square, which harmoniously blends into the single architectural ensemble with the "Қазақ Елі" monument, the Independence Palace, the Palace of Peace and Harmony, the "Hazret Sultan" cathedral mosque and the National University of Arts. Many values identified during the "Cultural Heritage" State Program constitute the invaluable fund of the National Museum of Kazakhstan.
The museum building is an eye catcher with its unusual external form. The largest unique museum complex has an area of 74,000 sq.m. and consists of seven blocks with a variable number of storeys to the ninth floor. Exhibit space occupies 14 rooms with a total area of over 14,000 sq.m.
The National Museum of Kazakhstan is composed of the following halls: Hall of Astana, Hall of Independent Kazakhstan, Hall of Gold, Hall of Ancient and Medieval History, the Hall of History, Ethnography Hall, Halls of Modern Art. The structure of the museum on studying the national heritage is represented by the Research Institute. There are also facilities for a children's museum, children's art centre, two showrooms, restoration workshops, laboratories, professional depositories, a scientific library with a reading room, a conference hall and souvenir stalls.
The museum is fitted out with equipment of international standard, one uses modern exhibition technology for expositions: a unique curved screen with a special content, working for two halls, a media floor, a dynamic layout of the central part of modern Astana, numerous media outlets, holograms, LED-technology, touch-sensitive kiosks, and a multimedia guide providing information in three languages.

The museum has been developing various kinds of excursions - survey and thematic, philosophical, special programs in the form of interactive sessions and gaming excursions.
The National Museum aims to become a modern intellectual cultural institution, a place for the analysis, comparison, reflection, discussion, and evaluation of statements on historical and cultural heritage of Kazakhstan. Contemporary museum is always an open dialogue with the visitor. This museum has done everything possible to make its visitors active participants in the conversation with the history.

See also
 List of museums in Kazakhstan
 The Museum of the First President of the Republic of Kazakhstan

References

Museums in Kazakhstan
Buildings and structures in Astana